A Strange Adventure is a 1956 American crime film directed by William Witney, written by Houston Branch and starring Joan Evans, Ben Cooper, Marla English, Jan Merlin, Nick Adams and Peter Miller. It was released on August 24, 1956 by Republic Pictures.

Plot
A trio of thieves make their getaway by kidnapping a young hot-rodder, and take over a mountain cabin for a hideout after overpowering its occupants.

Cast       
Joan Evans as Terry Dolgin
Ben Cooper as Harold Norton
Marla English as Lynn Novak
Jan Merlin as Al Kutner
Nick Adams as Phil Davis
Peter Miller as Luther Dolgin
Paul Smith as Carl Johnson
Emlen Davies as Mildred Norton
Frank Wilcox as The Public Defender
Thomas Browne Henry as Criminal Attorney
John Maxwell as Insurance Company Representative
Steve Wayne as Western Union Messenger

References

External links 
 

1956 films
American crime films
1956 crime films
Republic Pictures films
Films directed by William Witney
1950s English-language films
1950s American films
American black-and-white films